The Celebration Theatre is a 501(c)(3) non-profit theatre company in Los Angeles, founded in 1982. The company is located in West Hollywood, on the west end of Theatre Row, and specializes in works representing the LGBTQ+ experience.

History
Celebration Theatre was founded in 1982 by Charles Rowland, who leased a storefront in the Silver Lake area of Los Angeles, to start a company dedicated to producing gay-themed material.  In 1993, Robert Schrock took over as artistic director and moved the company to a 99-seat Equity waiver space in West Hollywood.  Since 1999, Schrock has been succeeded by Richard Israel, Derek Charles Livingston, Michael Matthews, Michael A. Shepperd and John Michael Beck. The current Co-Artistic Directors are Michael Matthews & Michael A. Shepperd.

Awards
 R. Christofer Sands, 2002 Ovation Award - Lead Actor in a Musical, Pinafore!
 Play it Cool, 2006 Ovation nomination - World Premiere Musical
 Jessica Sheridan, 2006 Ovation nomination - Lead Actress in a Musical, Play it Cool
 Louis Durra, 2006 Ovation nomination - Musical Direction, Play it Cool
 The Bacchae, 2007 Ovation nomination - Play Production, Intimate Theatre
 Beautiful Thing, 2007 Ovation nomination - Play Production, Intimate Theatre
 Michael Matthews, 2007 Ovation nomination - Direction of a Play, The Bacchae
 Michael Matthews, 2007 Ovation nomination - Direction of a Play, Beautiful Thing
 Tim Swiss, 2007 Ovation nomination - Lighting Design, Intimate Theatre, The Bacchae
 Cricket Myers, 2007 Ovation nomination - Sound Design, Intimate Theatre, The Bacchae
 Francesca Casale, 2008 Ovation nominee - Featured Actress in a Play, The Fastest Clock in the Universe
Jennifer R. Blake, 2010 Outstanding Performance by a Lead Actress in a Musical for the role of Susan in [title of show] from StagesceneLA's Best of LA Theatre Awards 2009-2010
 Women of Brewster Place, the Musical, 2010 Ovation Award - Best Production of A Musical, Intimate Theatre
 Michael Matthews, 2010 Ovation nomination - Best Director of A Musical, Women of Brewster Place, the Musical
 Ameenah Kaplan, 2010 Ovation nomination - Best Choreographer, Women of Brewster Place, the Musical
 Women of Brewster Place, the Musical, 2010 Ovation award - Best Acting Ensemble
 Michael Matthews, 2011 Ovation Nomination, Director of a Play Intimate Theatre, Take Me Out
 Brian Pugach, 2011 Ovation Nomination, Book for an Original Musical, The Next Fairy Tale
 BASH'd! A Gay Rap Opera, 2011 Ovation Nomination, Best Musical Intimate Theatre
 Ameenah Kaplan, 2011 Ovation Nomination, Director of a Musical, BASH'd! A Gay Rap Opera
 DJ Jedi, 2011 Ovation Nomination, Music Direction, BASH'd! A Gay Rap Opera
 2010/2011 Best Season Ovation Nomination

Current season

 Breakfast Brunch, by Jen Olivares. Directed and produced by Carolina Hoyos. September 28 - 29, 2022

Past Productions
 The Boy from Oz, Music and Lyrics by Peter Allen. Book by Martin Sherman and Nick Enright. Directed by Michael A. Shepperd. April 29, 2016
 Dream Boy, by Eric Rosen, Based on the novel by Jim Grimsley. Directed by Michael Matthews. January 29, 2016 - March 2016
 Bootycandy, by Robert O'Hara, Directed by Michael Matthews, - October 29, 2015 - December, 2015
 Stories I Can't Tell Mama, Written and Performed by Leslie Jordan, January/February 2012
 Christmastime is Queer4 more holiday mirth & mary-ment, December 9, 2011 - December 18, 2011
 What's Wrong with Angry?, Written by Patrick Wilde, Directed by Michael Matthews, - September 9, 2011 - Nov 19, 2011
 BASH'd! A Gay Rap Opera, Written by Chris Craddock and Nathan Cuckow, Directed by Ameenah Kaplan - June 10, 2011 - July 30, 2011
 The Next Fairy Tale, Book, Music and Lyrics by Brian Pugach, Directed by Michael A.Shepperd - March 11, 2011 - May 21, 2011
 Take Me Out, by Richard Greenberg, Directed by Michael Matthews - September 24, 2010 - February 19, 2011
 Title of Show, Book by Hunter Bell, Music and Lyrics by Jeff Bowen, Directed by Michael A.Shepperd - July 16 - September 11, 2010. In the cast were:  Jennifer R. Blake, Carey Peters, Jeffrey Landman, Micah McCain, and Gregory Nabours.
 Women of Brewster Place, the Musical, Book, Music and Lyrics by Tim Acito, Directed by Michael Matthews - April 23 - June 27, 2010
 Haram Iran, by Jay Paul Deratany, Directed by Michael Matthews - March 5 - April 4, 2010
 Fucking Men, by Joe DiPietro, Directed by Calvin Remsberg - January 8 - February 14, 2010
 Women Behind Bars, by Tom Eyen, Directed by Kurt Koehler - November 13 - December 20, 2009
 Fucking Men, Book by Joe DiPietro, Directed by Calvin Remsberg - September 11 - November, 2009
 Altar Boyz, Book by Kevin Del Aguila, Music and Lyrics by Gary Adler and Michael Patrick Walker, Directed by Patrick Pearson - July 10 - August 23, 2009
 Trafficking in Broken Hearts, Written by Edwin Sanchez, Directed by Efrain Schunior - May 15 - June 14, 2009
 The Prodigal Father, Written by Larry Dean Harris, Directed by Michael Matthews - March 27 - April 26, 2009
 Missionary Position, Written and Performed by Steven Fales - January 9 - February 22, 2009
 The Daddy Machine, Book by Patricia Laughrey, Music and Lyrics by Rayme Sciaroni - October 18 - December 20, 2008
 A Christmas Carol, Adapted by Jason Moyer, Directed by Michael A. Shepperd - November 28 - December 21, 2008
 Porcelain, by Chay Yew, Directed by Michael Matthews - October 10 - November 16, 2008
 Sissystrata, by Allain Rochel, Directed by Michael Matthews - August - September 28, 2008
 Songs from an Unmade Bed, Lyrics by Mark Campbell, Directed by Patrick Pearson - June 6 - August 10, 2008
 Coffee will make you Black, Book by April Sinclair Adapted by Michael A. Shepperd, Directed by Nataki Garrett - April - May 25, 2008
 Stupid Kids, by John C. Russell, Directed by Michael Matthews - February - April 6, 2008
 The Fastest Clock in the Universe, by Philip Ridley, Directed by Lynn Ann Bernatowicz - October 12 - November 18, 2007

References

External links
 Celebration Theatre official site https://www.instagram.com/celebrationthtr/?hl=en 

Performing groups established in 1982
LGBT theatre in the United States
Theatre companies in Los Angeles
LGBT theatre companies
1982 establishments in California